Donald Alan King (born May 4, 1954, in Fremont, Nebraska) is an American singer, songwriter, guitarist, and trumpeter. In the 1970s and 1980s, he recorded a total of four major label albums, and charted more than fifteen hit singles on the Billboard country music charts.

Early career
His first job was at a Quality Inn club in Nashville in 1974, where he was able to make valuable connections.  He signed with Con Brio Records and in 1976 his song "Cabin High (In the Blue Ridge Mountains)" placed him on the charts.  In 1977 he reached the Top 20 with "I've Got You to Come Home To", after which he released his first album, Dreams 'n Things.  His second album, Feelings So Right, (1978) yielded four Top 30 hits.  In 1979, the single "Lonely Hotel" reached the Top 40.  After two more hits in 1980 he began touring with well-known artists, such as Alabama, Reba McEntire, John Anderson, The Oak Ridge Boys, Conway Twitty, and Tammy Wynette. In 1981, he reached the Top 40 twice, first with his cover of Johnny Cash's "I Still Miss Someone" and then with "The Closer You Get." That same year he released his third album, Whirlwind.

Members of King's road band went on to become the country music group Sawyer Brown.

Later years
By the end of 1981, he had launched the Don King Music Group, a recording studio, with his father. In 1985 they built a 24-track studio to record demos.  In 1992, they added a video production company. In late 2007, GMV Nashville released two albums on King, and in 2008 they released two more, many including unreleased tracks.

Since 2007, Don King has been performing with The Road Crew 'America's Route 66 Band.' The Road Crew received the first Bobby Troup Artistic Achievement Award presented by the International Route 66 Association. The band are the official musical ambassadors of The Mother Road. The Road Crew bandmates are Woody Bomar, Jason Harmon and (songwriting partner) Joe Loesch.

Don King was inducted into The Old Time Country Music Hall of Fame by The National Traditional Country Music Association in 2015. This distinction honors his years of advancing traditional country music throughout his touring and recording career.

Discography

Albums

Singles

References

1954 births
American country guitarists
American male guitarists
American country singer-songwriters
American trumpeters
American male trumpeters
Living people
People from Fremont, Nebraska
Guitarists from Nebraska
20th-century American guitarists
21st-century trumpeters
20th-century American male musicians
21st-century American male musicians
Epic Records artists
American male singer-songwriters
Singer-songwriters from Nebraska